Ulrich "Uli" Bittcher (born 10 September 1957) is a retired German footballer who played as a midfielder. He made 252 appearances in the Bundesliga for Schalke 04 and Borussia Dortmund and played 38 matches in the 2. Bundesliga for Schalke.

References

External links 
 
 

1957 births
Living people
German footballers
Germany B international footballers
Association football midfielders
Bundesliga players
2. Bundesliga players
FC Schalke 04 players
Borussia Dortmund players
Sportspeople from Gelsenkirchen
Footballers from North Rhine-Westphalia